The Hamilton Philharmonic Orchestra (HPO) is a Canadian orchestra based in Hamilton, Ontario.  The orchestra gives concerts primarily at the FirstOntario Concert Hall.

History
The Hamilton Philharmonic Orchestra was founded in 1949.  Its first concert took place on 16 January 1950, at the Memorial School Auditorium.  Jan Wolanek was the first music director of the orchestra, from 1949 to 1958.  During the orchestra's history, Olive Short served as its concertmaster, the first female concertmaster in North America.

In the late 1960s, Betty Webster, Marnie Paikin and Larry Paikin developed a plan, known as "The Hamilton Plan", to bring music to the community from in-school children's concerts to international artists appearing with the Hamilton Philharmonic Orchestra. They organized concerts at which all school children in a 60-mile radius of Hamilton centre (excluding Toronto) would hear a brass ensemble, woodwind ensemble, string quartet and percussion ensemble in their school, followed by a trip to the orchestra hall at the end of the school year to hear a full symphony orchestra concert. The ensembles seeding the orchestra were headlined by Canadian Brass and the Czech String Quartet. The programme was studied by the American Symphony Orchestra League, and Chuck Mangione engaged the HPO for his Grammy Nominated album "Friends In Love."

To carry out the plan, Boris Brott was hired as music director in 1969. Under his direction, attendance at HPO concerts rose to about 225,000 throughout the early 1970s.  Under Brott, the orchestra developed to the point where it could accompany well-known international artists, including Phillipe Entremont and Maureen Forrester, and began to develop an international reputation.   In 1984, Michael Quigley published a book about the orchestra, A Centenary History of the Hamilton Philharmonic Orchestra.  However, the change in focus from a community orchestra to a full-time professional orchestra led to financial difficulties, and concert attendance began to recede.  Brott remained conductor of the orchestra until 1990.  

In 1996, the orchestra declared bankruptcy.  The orchestra re-emerged in 1997 as the New Hamilton Orchestra, with Mario Bernardi its as part-time artistic advisor through 1999.  Daniel Lipton succeeded Bernardi as part-time artistic advisor for the 1999-2000 season.  In 2000, the orchestra reverted to its former name.  Michael Reason served as its full-time artistic director from 2001 to 2006.  After an interim period with Timothy Vernon as artistic advisor,  James Sommerville was music director of the HPO from 2007 to 2015.

In 2015, Gemma New was named the HPO's music director.  The orchestra gave its first performance under her direction in February 2016.  New is the first female music director of the HPO.  Her most recent contract extension with the HPO is through the 2023-2024 season.

Music directors
 Jan Wolanek (1949-1958)
 Leonard Pearlman, Bryden Thomson (1958-1959)
 Victor Di Bello (1958-1962)
 Lee Hepner (1962-1969) 
 Boris Brott (1969-1990)
 Victor Feldbrill (1990-1996)
 James Sommerville (2007–2015)
 Gemma New (2015–present)

See also
 List of symphony orchestras
 Canadian classical music

References

External links
 Hamilton Philharmonic Orchestra

Canadian orchestras
Musical groups from Hamilton, Ontario
Organizations based in Hamilton, Ontario
Musical groups established in 1949
1949 establishments in Ontario